There are ten scheduled monuments in Leicester. These range from the Roman Jewry Wall and Raw Dykes to the medieval Leicester Castle and the early modern King William's Bridge. Several of the scheduled sites have a wide area protecting more than one feature. Seven of the fourteen Grade I listed buildings in Leicester are within the three most central scheduled areas.

In the United Kingdom, a scheduled monument is a "nationally important" archaeological site or historic building that has been given protection against unauthorised change. Scheduled monuments are defined in the Ancient Monuments and Archaeological Areas Act 1979 and the National Heritage Act 1983. They are also referred to as scheduled ancient monuments. There are about 18,300 scheduled monument entries on the list, which is maintained by English Heritage; more than one site can be included in a single entry. While a scheduled monument can also be recognised as a listed building, English Heritage considers listed building status as a better way of protecting buildings than scheduled monument status. If a monument is considered by English Heritage to "no longer merit scheduling" it can be descheduled.


List of monuments

See also 

 Grade I listed buildings in Leicester

References

External links 

 List of scheduled monuments in Leicester

Archaeological sites in Leicestershire
History of Leicester

Scheduled
Leicester